Ayleparrarntenhe is a twin-peaked hill east of the Devil's Marbles Conservation Reserve in the Northern Territory of Australia. It is the mythological home of Arrange, a mythological figure of the Alyawarre people.  Arrange is part of the creation myth of Karlu Karlu, the Alywawarre name for this formation.

References

Landforms of the Northern Territory
Hills of Australia
Sacred natural sites